Richard Pfob (1903 – December 1985) was an Austrian architect. His work was part of the architecture event in the art competition at the 1932 Summer Olympics.

References

1903 births
1985 deaths
20th-century Austrian architects
Olympic competitors in art competitions
Place of birth missing